Mike Clark (born December 16, 1972 in Dayton, Ohio) is a retired American soccer defender who spent eight seasons with the Columbus Crew in Major League Soccer.

Clark was born in Dayton, Ohio.  He attended Detroit Country Day High School and was a Parade Magazine High School All American soccer player.  He then attended Indiana University where he was team captain, starting every game and a mainstay on the Hoosiers soccer team from 1991 to 1994.  He started 91 games during his four seasons and was selected as a 1994 third team All American.

In 1995, he signed with the Richmond Kickers of the USISL.  That season, the Kickers won both the USISL and Open Cup championships.  In February 1996, the Columbus Crew selected Clark in the fourth round (thirty-first overall) in the 1996 MLS Inaugural Player Draft.  He is the most capped player for the Crew and was also voted to two MLS All-Star Games. In 1997, Clark married a nurse, Laura Hetrick Clark. In 2000 he had his first child, Michael Sean Clark Jr. In 2003 he had his 2nd and last child, Sophia Leigh Clark. He retired on March 16, 2004 holding the Crew record for games played, minutes played and games started.  He also played 22 playoff and 18 U.S. Open Cup games.

Before his retirement, he had entered the business world, owning two Great Clips franchises and working at a mortgage company.

He coached for the “Canterbury high school” Varsity Men’s soccer team and led them to numerous state victories.
Clark also started the “Mike Clark Soccer Camp” in Fort Wayne, Indiana.

In 2018 Clark and his family moved from Fort Wayne, Indiana to Wilmington, North Carolina. Where Clark currently works as a Medical Sales Representative for Hologic.

Honors

Club
Columbus Crew
 Lamar Hunt U.S. Open Cup: 2002

References

External links

Hoosiers in MLS

1972 births
Living people
American soccer players
Columbus Crew players
Indiana Hoosiers men's soccer players
Richmond Kickers players
USISL players
Major League Soccer players
Major League Soccer All-Stars
Soccer players from Michigan
Association football defenders